Tetraulax lateralis is a species of beetle in the family Cerambycidae. It was described by Karl Jordan in 1903.

References

Tetraulaxini
Beetles described in 1903
Taxa named by Karl Jordan